Tara Morgan (born 16 May 1989) is an Australian rules footballer who last played for Collingwood in the AFL Women's (AFLW).

Early life and state football
Morgan was raised in the Western Australia region of Kimberley in Kununurra, moving to Broome at the age of 11. In 2009 she joined WAWFL club South Fremantle. She started out playing as a forward, but moved to the back-line due to a player shortage and stayed there, playing as a half-back. She captained the club and won the best and fairest in the 2016 season. Despite her club success, she missed out on selection at state level and for the annual exhibition matches on several occasions.

In 2019 Morgan returned to local football, taking on the captaincy of the VU Western Spurs in the first division of the Northern Football Netball League.

AFL Women's career
She made her debut in round 1, 2017, in the inaugural AFLW match at IKON Park against . During the season she was roommates with fellow West Australian teammate Caitlyn Edwards.

Collingwood re-signed Morgan for the 2018 season during the trade period in May 2017.

In June 2018, Morgan was delisted by Collingwood.

Statistics
Statistics are correct to the end of the 2018 season.

|- style="background-color: #eaeaea"
! scope="row" style="text-align:center" | 2017
|style="text-align:center;"|
| 26 || 7 || 0 || 0 || 29 || 8 || 37 || 11 || 20 || 0.0 || 0.0 || 4.1 || 1.1 || 5.3 || 1.6 || 2.9
|- 
! scope="row" style="text-align:center" | 2018
|style="text-align:center;"|
| 26 || 4 || 0 || 0 || 21 || 5 || 26 || 8 || 4 || 0.0 || 0.0 || 5.3 || 1.3 || 6.5 || 2.0 || 1.0
|- class="sortbottom"
! colspan=3| Career
! 11
! 0
! 0
! 50
! 13
! 63
! 19
! 24
! 0.0
! 0.0
! 4.5
! 1.2
! 5.7
! 1.7
! 2.2
|}

References

External links

 
 Living the AFL Dream – a fan blog following Morgan's AFL Women's career

Living people
1989 births
Collingwood Football Club (AFLW) players
Australian rules footballers from Western Australia
Sportswomen from Western Australia